The butterfly sculpin (Hemilepidotus papillon) is a species of fish in the family Agonidae. It is found in the North Pacific Ocean.

Taxonomy
The butterfly sculpin was first formally described in 1880 as Melletes papilio by the American ichthyologist Tarleton Hoffman Bean with its type locality  given as Saint Paul Island in the Pribilof Islands in the Bering Sea off Alaska. Bean proposed the monospecific genus Melletes' fo the butterfly sculpin but later workers have placed it in the genus Hemilepidotus. The specific name papilio'' means "butterfly".

Description

The butterfly sculpin is reddish brown, yellow and white in color, with a metallic gold sheen. There are four blackish bars on the upper flanks which extend onto the dorsal fin, these bands vary in their definition. This fish has between 11 and 13 spines and 19 or 20 soft rays in its dorsal fins while there are no spines and between 16 and 18 soft rays in its anal fin.The scales in the ventral scale row are less than half the size of the scales in the dorsal scale row. The membrane of the first, spiny dorsal fin is deeply notched. There are four spines on the preoperculum with the fourt spine being simple.

Distribution
The butterfly sculpin lives in benthopelagic marine environments of the northern Pacific Ocean and the Sea of Okhotsk, in sandy or silty flat areas.

Biology
Butterfly sculpins are predators feeding on gammarid amphipods, crabs, ostracods and small fish such as juvenile Alaska pollock.

References

Butterfly sculpin
Fish described in 1880
Taxa named by Tarleton Hoffman Bean